I, Cesar is a 2003 French comedy film directed by Richard Berry.

Plot
César is a young boy living in Montmartre, Paris, with his parents. Morgan, his friend, tries to find his father in London. César accompanies him in his quest, with another friend, the prettiest girl in the school, Sarah, who speaks English.

Cast 
 Jules Sitruk – César Petit
 Mabô Kouyaté – Morgan Boulanger
 Joséphine Berry – Sarah Delgado
 Maria de Medeiros – Chantal Petit
 Jean-Philippe Écoffey – Bertrand Petit
 Anna Karina – Gloria 
 Jean Benguigui – Papy 
 Murray Head – Charley Fitzpatrick  
 Jean-Paul Rouve – The gym teacher 
 Catherine Hosmalin – The baker

References

External links

2003 films
2003 comedy films
French comedy-drama films
Films directed by Richard Berry
2003 comedy-drama films
2000s French films